Sleepy Hollow State Park is a public recreation area covering  in the townships of Ovid and Victor in Clinton County, Michigan. The state park is located off US-127 nine miles southeast of St. Johns and four miles northwest of Laingsburg and centers on man-made,  Lake Ovid.

History
The park was created through a series of land acquisitions in the late 1960s followed by the damming the Little Maple River to create Lake Ovid. The state opened the park in 1976. In 2009, the 18-Hole Legend Disc Golf course was introduced.

Wildlife
At , Lake Ovid is the largest body of water in the surrounding area. The lake's fish species include catfish, black crappie, largemouth bass, muskellunge, sunfish, yellow perch, and other freshwater species — bluegill, northern pike, bowfin, brown bullhead, carp, white sucker, pumpkinseed, and yellow bullhead. The lake is stocked with muskellunge and channel catfish. Migrating waterfowl, shorebirds and passerines are drawn to Lake Ovid, and more than 228 bird species have been recorded in the park.

Activities and amenities
The park's recreational features include swimming, boating and fishing on Lake Ovid (enforced as a "no wake" lake), 11 miles of trails for hiking, biking and cross-country skiing, six miles of equestrian trails, picnicking facilities, disc golf, and areas for hunting, snowmobiling, and camping.

Camping 
Sleepy Hollow provides 181 campsites shared between their North and South campgrounds. All campsites are accommodated with electricity and close access to safe drinking water.

The park has 181 modern campsites, split up between the North and South campgrounds. Reservations can be made online or over call. The camping season ranges from June until October, but also offers winter camping. These campsites have close access to electricity and water.

There is also access to other means of overnight stay, including a modern and rustic cabin, rustic walk-in campsites, and an organizational campground.

References

External links

Sleepy Hollow State Park Michigan Department of Natural Resources
Sleepy Hollow State Park Map Michigan Department of Natural Resources

State parks of Michigan
Protected areas of Clinton County, Michigan
Protected areas established in 1976